A diversity index is a quantitative measure that reflects how many different types (such as species) there are in a dataset (a community), and that can simultaneously take into account the phylogenetic relations among the individuals distributed among those types, such as richness, divergence or evenness. These indices are statistical  representations of biodiversity in different aspects (richness, evenness, and dominance).

Effective number of species or Hill numbers 
When diversity indices are used in ecology, the types of interest are usually species, but they can also be other categories, such as genera, families, functional types, or haplotypes. The entities of interest are usually individual plants or animals, and the measure of abundance can be, for example, number of individuals, biomass or coverage. In demography, the entities of interest can be people, and the types of interest various demographic groups. In information science, the entities can be characters and the types of the different letters of the alphabet. The most commonly used diversity indices are simple transformations of the effective number of types (also known as 'true diversity'), but each diversity index can also be interpreted in its own right as a measure corresponding to some real phenomenon (but a different one for each diversity index).

Many indices only account for categorical diversity between subjects or entities. Such indices, however do not account for the total variation (diversity) that can be held between subjects or entities which occurs only when both categorical and qualitative diversity are calculated.

True diversity, or the effective number of types, refers to the number of equally abundant types needed for the average proportional abundance of the types to equal that observed in the dataset of interest (where all types may not be equally abundant). The true diversity in a dataset is calculated by first taking the weighted generalized mean  of the proportional abundances of the types in the dataset, and then taking the reciprocal of this. The equation is:

The denominator  equals the average proportional abundance of the types in the dataset as calculated with the weighted generalized mean with exponent . The proportional abundances themselves are used as the nominal weights. The numbers  are called Hill numbers of order q or effective number of species.

When , the above equation is undefined.  However, the mathematical limit as  approaches 1 is well defined and the corresponding diversity is calculated with the following equation:

which is the exponential of the Shannon entropy calculated with natural logarithms (see above). In other domains, this statistic is also known as the perplexity.

The general equation of diversity is often written in the form

and the term inside the parentheses is called the basic sum.

Sensitivity of the diversity value to rare vs. abundant species 
It defines the sensitivity of the true diversity to rare vs. abundant species by modifying how the weighted mean of the species' proportional abundances is calculated. With some values of the parameter , the value of the generalized mean  assumes familiar kinds of weighted means as special cases. In particular, 

  corresponds to the weighted harmonic mean, 
  to the weighted geometric mean, and 
  to the weighted arithmetic mean.
 As  approaches infinity, the weighted generalized mean with exponent  approaches the maximum  value, which is the proportional abundance of the most abundant species in the dataset. 

Generally, increasing the value of  increases the effective weight given to the most abundant species. This leads to obtaining a larger  value and a smaller true diversity value with increasing .

When , the weighted geometric mean of the  values is used, and each species is exactly weighted by its proportional abundance (in the weighted geometric mean, the weights are the exponents). When , the weight given to abundant species is exaggerated, and when , the weight given to rare species is. At , the species weights exactly cancel out the species proportional abundances, such that the weighted mean of the  values equals  even when all species are not equally abundant. At , the effective number of species, hence equals the actual number of species . In the context of diversity,  is generally limited to non-negative values. This is because negative values of  would give rare species so much more weight than abundant ones that  would exceed .

Richness

Richness  simply quantifies how many different types the dataset of interest contains. For example, species richness (usually noted ) of a dataset is the number of species in the corresponding species list. Richness is a simple measure, so it has been a popular diversity index in ecology, where abundance data are often not available for the datasets of interest. Because richness does not take the abundance of the types into account, it is not the same thing as diversity, which does take abundance into account.

Shannon index
The Shannon index has been a popular diversity index in the ecological literature, where it is also known as Shannon's diversity index, Shannon–Wiener index, and (erroneously) Shannon–Weaver index. The measure was originally proposed by Claude Shannon in 1948 to quantify the entropy (hence Shannon entropy, related to Shannon information content) in strings of text. The idea is that the more letters there are, and the closer their proportional abundances in the string of interest, the more difficult it is to correctly predict which letter will be the next one in the string. The Shannon entropy quantifies the uncertainty (entropy or degree of surprise) associated with this prediction. It is most often calculated as follows:

where  is the proportion of characters belonging to the th type of letter in the string of interest. In ecology,  is often the proportion of individuals belonging to the th species in the dataset of interest. Then the Shannon entropy quantifies the uncertainty in predicting the species identity of an individual that is taken at random from the dataset.

Although the equation is here written with natural logarithms, the base of the logarithm used when calculating the Shannon entropy can be chosen freely.

The Shannon index ({{math|H'''}}) is related to the weighted geometric mean of the proportional abundances of the types. Specifically, it equals the logarithm of true diversity as calculated with :

This can also be written

which equals

Since the sum of the  values equals unity by definition, the denominator equals the weighted geometric mean of the  values, with the  values themselves being used as the weights (exponents in the equation). The term within the parentheses hence equals true diversity , and {{math|H}} equals .

When all types in the dataset of interest are equally common, all  values equal , and the Shannon index hence takes the value . The more unequal the abundances of the types, the larger the weighted geometric mean of the  values, and the smaller the corresponding Shannon entropy. If practically all abundance is concentrated to one type, and the other types are very rare (even if there are many of them), Shannon entropy approaches zero. When there is only one type in the dataset, Shannon entropy exactly equals zero (there is no uncertainty in predicting the type of the next randomly chosen entity).

In machine learning the Shannon index is also called as Information gain.

Rényi entropy
It can be expressed:

which equals

Simpson index
The Simpson index was introduced in 1949 by Edward H. Simpson to measure the degree of concentration when individuals are classified into types. The same index was rediscovered by Orris C. Herfindahl in 1950. The square root of the index had already been introduced in 1945 by the economist Albert O. Hirschman. As a result, the same measure is usually known as the Simpson index in ecology, and as the Herfindahl index or the Herfindahl–Hirschman index (HHI) in economics.

The measure equals the probability that two entities taken at random from the dataset of interest represent the same type. It equals:

,

where  is richness (the total number of types in the dataset). This equation is also equal to the weighted arithmetic mean of the proportional abundances  of the types of interest, with the proportional abundances themselves being used as the weights. Proportional abundances are by definition constrained to values between zero and unity, but it is a weighted arithmetic mean, hence , which is reached when all types are equally abundant.

The original Simpson's index hence equals the corresponding basic sum.

The interpretation of λ as the probability that two entities taken at random from the dataset of interest represent the same type assumes that the first entity is replaced to the dataset before taking the second entity. If the dataset is very large, sampling without replacement gives approximately the same result, but in small datasets, the difference can be substantial. If the dataset is small, and sampling without replacement is assumed, the probability of obtaining the same type with both random draws is:

This form of the Simpson index is also known as the Hunter–Gaston index in microbiology.

Since the mean proportional abundance of the types increases with decreasing number of types and increasing abundance of the most abundant type, λ obtains small values in datasets of high diversity and large values in datasets of low diversity. This is counterintuitive behavior for a diversity index, so often, such transformations of λ that increase with increasing diversity have been used instead. The most popular of such indices have been the inverse Simpson index (1/λ) and the Gini–Simpson index (1 − λ). Both of these have also been called the Simpson index in the ecological literature, so care is needed to avoid accidentally comparing the different indices as if they were the same.

Inverse Simpson index
The inverse Simpson index equals:

This simply equals true diversity of order 2, i.e. the effective number of types that is obtained when the weighted arithmetic mean is used to quantify average proportional abundance of types in the dataset of interest.

The index is also used as a measure of the effective number of parties.

Gini–Simpson index

The Gini-Simpson Index is also called Gini impurity, or Gini's diversity index' in the field of Machine Learning. The original Simpson index λ equals the probability that two entities taken at random from the dataset of interest (with replacement) represent the same type. Its transformation 1 − λ, therefore, equals the probability that the two entities represent different types. This measure is also known in ecology as the probability of interspecific encounter (PIE'') and the Gini–Simpson index. It can be expressed as a transformation of the true diversity of order 2:

The Gibbs–Martin index of sociology, psychology, and management studies, which is also known as the Blau index, is the same measure as the Gini–Simpson index.

The quantity is also known as the expected heterozygosity in population genetics.

Berger–Parker index
The Berger–Parker index equals the maximum  value in the dataset, i.e., the proportional abundance of the most abundant type. This corresponds to the weighted generalized mean of the  values when  approaches infinity, and hence equals the inverse of the true diversity of order infinity.

See also

References

Further reading
 
   See chapter 5 for an elaboration of coding procedures described informally above.

External links
 Simpson's Diversity index
 Diversity indices gives some examples of estimates of Simpson's index for real ecosystems.

Measurement of biodiversity
Index numbers
Summary statistics for categorical data